Giovanni Francesco de Lorenzi (25 March 1635 – October 1698) was a Roman Catholic prelate who served as Bishop of Venosa (1685–1698).

Biography
Giovanni Francesco de Lorenzi was born in Ripatransone, Italy on 25 March 1635.
On 14 May 1685, he was appointed during the papacy of Pope Innocent XI as Bishop of Venosa.
He served as Bishop of Venosa until his death in October 1698.

References

External links and additional sources
 (for Chronology of Bishops) 
 (for Chronology of Bishops) 

17th-century Italian Roman Catholic bishops
Bishops appointed by Pope Innocent XI
1635 births
1698 deaths